Casey Joseph Toohill (born August 22, 1996) is an American football defensive end for the Washington Commanders of the National Football League (NFL). He played college football at Stanford and was drafted by the Philadelphia Eagles in the seventh round of the 2020 NFL Draft.

College career
A three-star recruit, Toohill committed to Stanford to play football over offers from Boston College, Nevada, Utah, Washington, and Washington State, among others. Toohill started all 12 games as a fifth-year senior at Stanford. He earned second-team All-Pac-12 honors after recording 11.5 tackles for loss, eight sacks, and 60 tackles. In his career, he had 124 tackles (21.5 for loss), 14 sacks, and an interception.

Professional career

Philadelphia Eagles
Toohill was selected by the Philadelphia Eagles in the seventh round, 233rd overall, of the 2020 NFL Draft. He was waived by the Eagles on October 13, 2020.

Washington Football Team / Commanders
Toohill was claimed off waivers by the Washington Football Team a day after. In Week 6 of the 2021 season, Toohill recorded his first career sack on Kansas City Chiefs quarterback, Patrick Mahomes. He had his first career start in Week 11 against the Carolina Panthers in place of Chase Young, who was placed on the team's injured reserve. On December 11, 2021, he was placed on COVID-19 reserve list and was forced to sit out the Week 14 game against the Dallas Cowboys, but reactivated a week later.

In Week 10 of the 2022 season, Toohill scored his first career touchdown in the victory over the then undefeated Philadelphia Eagles where he recovered the ball from a failed lateral pass from Eagles receiver DeVonta Smith and returned it to the endzone in the final play of the game.

References

External links
Washington Commanders bio
Stanford Cardinal bio

1996 births
Living people
Players of American football from San Diego
American football linebackers
American football defensive ends
Stanford Cardinal football players
Philadelphia Eagles players
Washington Commanders players
Washington Football Team players